Maloye Barakovo is a rural locality (a village) in Kichmegnskoye Rural Settlement, Kichmengsko-Gorodetsky District, Vologda Oblast, Russia. The population was 8 as of 2002.

Geography 
Maloye Barakovo is located 14 km southeast of Kichmengsky Gorodok (the district's administrative centre) by road. Bolshoye Burtanovo is the nearest rural locality.

References 

Rural localities in Kichmengsko-Gorodetsky District